Alexander Escobar Rosales (born April 4, 1984) is a Salvadoran footballer.

Club career
He played in the C.D. San Francisco Junior youth teams and has played all of his professional career at A.D. Isidro Metapán, since making his debut in 2001.

International career
Nicknamed la Rastra, Escobar made his debut for El Salvador in a January 2003 friendly match against Guatemala and has, as of December 2010, earned a total of 34 caps, scoring no goals. He has represented his country in 7 FIFA World Cup qualification matches and played at the 2003 and 2009 UNCAF Nations Cups as well as at the 2007 and 2009 CONCACAF Gold Cups.

References

External links
 

1984 births
Living people
People from Santa Ana Department
Association football central defenders
Salvadoran footballers
El Salvador international footballers
2003 UNCAF Nations Cup players
2005 UNCAF Nations Cup players
2007 CONCACAF Gold Cup players
2009 UNCAF Nations Cup players
2009 CONCACAF Gold Cup players
A.D. Isidro Metapán footballers